The Ricotta Eaters is a c.1585 oil on canvas painting by Vincenzo Campi, showing four figures eating a round ricotta. The artist himself entitled it Buffonaria, which links its four figures to Commedia dell'arte characters, and depicted himself as Pantalone, wearing red costume. In 1875, the work was presented by Jacques Bernard to the Museum of Fine Arts of Lyon, where it is currently displayed.

Symbolism

The ricotta placed on the tray appears to form an image of the skull, symbolizing memento mori, a reminder of death, in an atmosphere characterised by excess and abandon.

References

External links
The Ricotta Eaters at Musée des Beaux-Arts de Lyon

Italian paintings
Paintings in the collection of the Museum of Fine Arts of Lyon
1580 paintings
Self-portraits
Food and drink paintings
Memento mori
Commedia dell'arte
Ricotta eaters